Thomas Fuller (1662-1733) represented Dedham, Massachusetts in the Great and General Court in 1723 and 1724. He also served as a selectman for five years in Dedham, beginning in  1702. He was also the town treasurer from 1715 to 1717.

He was born June 23, 1662, likely in Dedham, and died on April 23, 1733, likely in Needham, Massachusetts. In 1688, he married Esther Fisher and they had six children.

References

Works cited

Members of the colonial Massachusetts General Court from Dedham
1662 births
1733 deaths
Politicians from Needham, Massachusetts
Dedham, Massachusetts selectmen